Theatre Royal, aka Lilli Palmer Theatre is an Anglo/American half-hour television anthology series hosted by Lilli Palmer. It was the first ITV play series; and was first transmitted on 25 September 1955, with the televised Dickens episode, Bardell v Pickwick. Thirty-four episodes aired in the UK on ATV London in 1955–56. Fourteen episodes aired in the US from 1955–56. 

Notable guest stars included Maggie Smith, Wendy Hiller, Stephen Boyd, Marius Goring, Michael Gough and Wilfrid Hyde-White.

References

External links

Theatre Royal at CVTA with list of episodes

1950s American anthology television series
1955 American television series debuts
1956 American television series endings
1955 British television series debuts
1955 British television series endings
1950s British drama television series
1950s American drama television series
1950s British anthology television series
1960s British anthology television series
English-language television shows
Black-and-white British television shows